The Ukrainian Beach Soccer Premier League is the top men's league of Ukrainian beach soccer. It was founded in 2002. It is organized by the Football Federation of Ukraine (FFU). Between leagues at the end of each season, the teams exchanged - the worst drop in the lower-ranking division, their places are taken by the best team of the lower leagues.

Seasons

Performance by club

See also 
 FIFA Beach Soccer World Cup
 Euro Beach Soccer League
 Euro Beach Soccer Cup

External links 
  
 Beach soccer on the FFU 

Beach soccer competitions in Ukraine
National beach soccer leagues
Beach
Sports leagues established in 2002
2002 establishments in Ukraine
Beach soccer
Professional sports leagues in Ukraine